IQN may refer to:

 IQnovate, an Australian life sciences organization (NSX symbol: IQN)
 Qingyang Xifeng Airport, an airport in Gansu Province, China (IATA code: IQN)